The Kechika Ranges are a subrange of the Cassiar Mountains subdivision of the Interior Mountains in far northern British Columbia, Canada, lying west of the Rocky Mountain Trench between the Rainbow (S) and Deadwood Rivers (N).

See also
Kechika River

References

Canadian Mountain Encyclopedia entry

Cassiar Mountains
Northern Interior of British Columbia